Arnold J. "Arnie" Simkus (born March 25, 1943) is a former American football player.  Simkus was born in Schlava, Germany and immigrated to the United States as a boy.  He graduated from Cass Tech High School in Detroit, Michigan before enrolling at the University of Michigan.  He was a member of the 1964 Michigan Wolverines football team that won the Big Ten Conference championship and defeated Oregon State in the 1965 Rose Bowl.  On November 28, 1964, Simkus was drafted by the Cleveland Browns in the sixth round (72nd overall pick) of the 1965 NFL Draft.  In April 1965, Simkus signed a contract to play professional football for the  American Football League's New York Jets.  Simkus played in only one game for the Jets in the 1965 season and later signed with the Minnesota Vikings.  He played in 11 games for the Vikings during the 1967 NFL season.  Simkus later formed All-American Lifeguard, a personal training service based in Warren, Michigan.

References

Michigan Wolverines football players
New York Jets players
Minnesota Vikings players
1943 births
Living people